The eighth season of the stop-motion television series Robot Chicken began airing in the United States on Cartoon Network's late night programming block, Adult Swim, on October 26, 2015, with the episode Robot Chicken DC Comics Special III: Magical Friendship.

Episodes

Notes

References

2015 American television seasons
2016 American television seasons
Robot Chicken seasons